Get Used to It is the second album by the American band Rhino Bucket, released in 1992. "Ride with Yourself" appeared in the movie Wayne's World and on its soundtrack. The band supported the album with a North American tour.

Production
Produced by Terry Manning, the album was very influenced by AC/DC.

Critical reception

The Los Angeles Times noted that Rhino Bucket's "sound comes from their years listening to the euphoric racket of AC/DC, Black Sabbath, Led Zeppelin, Cheap Trick and Kiss, among other hard-rock heroes from the 1970s." The Buffalo News concluded that "Georg Dolivo's sandblaster voice and the tight no-frills (roots metal?) band can't quite overcome the lack of inspiration in the songwriting."

AllMusic wrote: "The riffs are more important [than] the song and, in the band's favor, they come up with a fair share of solid hooks."

Track listing
Beat to Death Like a Dog (4:54)
No Friend of Mine (3:37)
Hey There (4:15)
The Devil Sent You (4:05)
This Ain't Heaven (4:21)
She's a Screamer (3:42)
Bar Time (4:14)
Burn the World (3:56)
Ride with Yourself (3:16)
Scratch 'n' Sniff (3:55)
Stomp (2:32)

Personnel
 Georg Dolivo: lead vocals, rhythm guitar
 Greg Fields: lead guitar, backing vocals
 Reeve Downes: bass guitar, backing vocals
 Liam Jason: drums

References

Rhino Bucket albums
1992 albums
Albums produced by Terry Manning